Tripoli is a 1950 American adventure film directed by Will Price and written by Winston Miller. The film is a fictionalized account of the Battle of Derna at Derna, a coastal town in modern eastern Libya in April 1805 against Tripoli, one of the four Barbary states in North Africa and stars John Payne, Maureen O'Hara, Howard Da Silva, Phillip Reed, Grant Withers, Lowell Gilmore and Connie Gilchrist. The film was released on November 9, 1950, by Paramount Pictures. The film was re-released by Citation Films Inc. and retitled The First Marines.

Plot
In 1805, the USS Essex is part of a blockade of the port of Tripoli by the small United States Navy Mediterranean squadron, targeting pirates menacing American shipping. American diplomatic Consul William Eaton (Herbert Heyes) comes on board to recruit a small commando squad for a secret mission. Lt. Presley O'Bannon, of the U.S. Marine Corps (John Payne) and Lt. Tripp (Lowell Gilmore) volunteer to raise a force to seize Derna, a strategic coastal town to the east. Hamet Karamanly (Phillip Reed), exiled former Pasha of Derna, supplies men in exchange for being restored to his throne which was taken by his brother. Countess Sheila D’Areneau (Maureen O'Hara) stays with the Pasha, and everyone presumes she is his mistress, while she angles into persuading him to marry her. O'Bannon recruits a native force of mercenaries - Greeks, Turks and Arabs - to accompany his Marines and some American soldiers and Navy midshipmen. O'Bannon and Countess D’Arneau meet and are attracted to each other, but both refuse to admit it to themselves.

D’Arneau convinces Hamet that the Americans plan to turn him over to his brother, but O’Bannon gets him to change his mind. D’Arneau defies O’Bannon and accompanies the expedition from Alexandria, Egypt, across the North African deserts, but he forces her to travel with the camp followers. After a waterhole is poisoned, the expedition has to cross a dune sea to reach the next waterhole ahead of the poisoners. O’Bannon kisses the countess and the force has to endure a sandstorm. Hamet's brother offers him a deal: half the kingdom in return for getting rid of the Americans. They reach the coast twelve days late and the American navy squadron under Commodore Samuel Barron is not yet there. There is almost a mutiny before the ships arrives. Hamet tells his brother the plan of attack on Derna. When the countess learns of this, she rides to warn O’Bannon. He leads a surprise attack on the city and captures it. Lt. O’Bannon and the countess become a couple.

Cast 
John Payne as Lt. Presley O'Bannon, USMC (1776-1850)
Maureen O'Hara as Countess Sheila D'Arneau
Howard Da Silva as Capt. Demetrios
Phillip Reed as Hamet Karamanly
Grant Withers as Sgt. Derek, USMC
Lowell Gilmore as Lt. Tripp, USN
Connie Gilchrist as Henriette
Alan Napier as Khalil
Herbert Heyes as American Consul William Eaton, (1764-1811)
Alberto Morin as Il Taiib
Emil Hanna as Interpreter
Grandon Rhodes as Commodore Samuel Barron, (U.S. Navy - Mediterranean squadron), (1765-1810)
Frank Fenton as Capt. Adams, USN
Rosa Turich as Seewauk
Ray Hyke as Crawford
Walter Reed as Wade
Paul Livermore as Evans
Gregg Barton as Huggins
Don Summers as Langley
Jack Pennick as Busch
Ewing Mitchell as Elroy

Production
There was a vogue for films about the Barbary War at this time: Universal had made Slave Girl (1947) and Columbia Barbary Pirate (1949). Payne and O'Hara had appeared together in To the Shores of Tripoli (1942).

The film was originally called The Barbarians and was a story by Will Price and Winston Miller. Will Price, a former Marine, was then Maureen O'Hara's husband. Pine-Thomas bought the story in 1949. It was to have starred Dennis O'Keefe who just made The Eagle and the Hawk for Pine-Thomas, as Presley O'Bannon. Price's wife Maureen O'Hara agreed to play the female lead. Eventually Payne played the male lead instead of O'Keefe.

Filming took 33 days.

Reception
The film was popular and made $1.6 million in North America.

References

External links 
 
 

1950 films
Paramount Pictures films
American historical adventure films
1950s historical adventure films
Films set in Libya
Films about the United States Navy
1950s war adventure films
Films about the United States Marine Corps
Films set in 1805
Barbary Wars
American war adventure films
Films directed by Will Price
1950s English-language films
1950s American films